Robert Foster (born 12 July 1970 in Trelawny, Jamaica) is a Jamaican track and field athlete.  He competed for his native country in two Olympics, running the 110 metres hurdles in 1996 and 2000.  He also ran in the 1995 IAAF World Indoor Championships and the 1995 World Championships in Athletics competing in both the hurdles and on the Jamaican 4 × 100 metres relay in the semi-final round.

Running for Fresno State University, he was the NCAA Champion in 1994 both indoors and outdoors.  He still holds the WAC record.  Prior to that, running for Porterville College he was the two time California State Junior College champion.

Following his athletic career he took up coaching first at Annapolis High School, Dearborn Heights, Michigan and then returning to his alma mater, coaching his step-daughter in both places.

References

External links
 

1970 births
Living people
People from Trelawny Parish
Jamaican male hurdlers
Jamaican male sprinters
Athletes (track and field) at the 1994 Commonwealth Games
Athletes (track and field) at the 1996 Summer Olympics
Athletes (track and field) at the 2000 Summer Olympics
Olympic athletes of Jamaica
Commonwealth Games competitors for Jamaica
20th-century Jamaican people
21st-century Jamaican people